The Realness is the debut studio album by American rapper Cormega. It features guest appearances from Mobb Deep and Tragedy Khadafi, as well as production from Havoc of Mobb Deep, J-Love, and The Alchemist, among others. It was released via Legal Hustle Records and LandSpeed Records.

The Realness was re-released in 2007 with The True Meaning, Cormega's second album from 2002, in a double special-edition package. The album's sequel, The Realness II, was released on October 7, 2022.

Background 
Cormega rose to fame in the mid-90s as an original member of The Firm hip hop group, along with Nas, AZ and Foxy Brown, appearing on the song "Affirmative Action" from the Nas album It Was Written. After being booted from the group, Cormega signed a record deal with Def Jam Recordings, and recorded his first album The Testament. The album was eventually shelved, and Cormega was dropped from label, joining LandSpeed Records for his first official release.

Critical reception 

The Realness received mostly positive reviews. J-23 of HipHopDX praised the album's production, calling it a "pleasant surprise". Matt Conaway of AllMusic stated that the album paints Cormega as "one of the most promising thug poets to emerge in quite sometime".

Track listing 

Sample credits
American Beauty
"I've Been Watching You" by Southside Movement
R U My Nigga?
"Night Moves" by Frank McDonald
Unforgiven'
"4th Movement: Passacaglia" by Yusef Lateef
Rap's a Hustle
"I Choose You" by Willie Hutch
Fallen Soldiers
"Beggar's Song" by Wet Willie
They Forced My Hand
"Signal Your Intention" by Hodges, James and Smith
Glory Days
"Each Day I Cry a Little" by Eddie Kendricks
You Don't Want It
"Alone in the Ring" by Bill Conti
Fallen Soldiers (Remix)
"Time" by Morning, Noon & Night

Charts

Release history

References 

2001 debut albums
Cormega albums
Albums produced by Ayatollah
Albums produced by Havoc (musician)
Albums produced by Sha Money XL
Albums produced by the Alchemist (musician)
Albums produced by Godfather Don